Cubic FasTIS ("Flexible and Secure Ticket Issuing System") is the latest TIS introduced to the UK National Rail Retailers.  The prototype was piloted at Chiltern Railways High Wycombe station from April 2005, the second pilot machine was deployed at Banbury station.  Following successful piloting, both Northern Rail and Chiltern Railways selected FasTIS to replace their APTIS fleet.

Notably, the prototype at High Wycombe was destroyed when the station burnt down on Sunday 27 November 2005.

FasTIS was rolled out across all Northern locations from around December 2005; Chiltern rolled out across their stations around mid-2006.

Developed by Cubic Transportation Systems, FasTIS is unique in embedding a journey planner. FasTIS was derived from the LUL Ticket Office Machine developed for the TfL Prestige Project.

CTSL was also the maintainer of heritage TISs – APTIS and SPORTIS – after taking over Thorn Transit Systems in April 1997.

A derivation of FasTIS called FasTIS+ was commissioned by RSP in late 2006 to replace the APTIS-ANT combination in London, used to retail TfL Oyster card products.  FasTIS+ fully integrates the TfL Oyster and National Rail sales, and 99 machines are currently deployed across in-zone London rail stations.

Cubic FasTIS is now being replaced by Cubic FTO machine - 64bit and PCI-DSS secure

References

Fare collection systems in the United Kingdom
Travel technology